Nansi  can refer to:

Nansi Lake, lake in Shandong Province in China
Nansi Richards (1888–1979), Welsh harpist
Nansi District, sometimes spelled Nanxi, a district in Tainan, Taiwan
Nansi Nevins, singer in Sweetwater (band)
Nansi, a variant spelling of mythological spider Anansi